The voiced retroflex lateral affricate is a rare consonantal sound, used in some spoken languages.

Features
Features of the voiceless retroflex lateral affricate:

Occurrence

References

Affricates
Retroflex consonants
Lateral consonants
Pulmonic consonants
Voiceless oral consonants